Binomial identity may refer to:

 Binomial theorem
 Binomial type

See also 
Binomial (disambiguation)